Bull Run Mountains Natural Area Preserve is a  Natural Area Preserve located along the Bull Run Mountains in Fauquier and Prince William counties, Virginia.  Dedicated in 2002, the majority of the preserve is owned and operated by the Virginia Outdoors Foundation (VOF).  It harbors a number of outstanding natural community types, some of which are rare in the Commonwealth.  There are also quartzite cliffs and boulder fields around High Point Mountain within the preserve's boundaries.

While most of the preserve is prioritized for scientific and educational activities, the Virginia Outdoors Foundation keeps 800 acres of the preserve open to the public on Friday-Sunday (8am-6pm) for low-impact uses such as hiking and wildlife observation. On November 25, 2014, the Virginia Outdoors Foundation announced that the private landowner of the High Point cliff area on the preserve would close the cliffs to the public for an indefinite period of recovery and restoration, starting January 15, 2015. 

The preserve is part of the Virginia Outdoors Foundation's Bull Run Mountains Special Project Area, which encompasses .

See also
 List of Virginia Natural Area Preserves

References

External links
Bull Run Mountains.org website
Virginia Outdoors Foundation
Virginia Department of Conservation and Recreation: Bull Run Mountains Natural Area Preserve

Virginia Natural Area Preserves
Protected areas of Fauquier County, Virginia
Protected areas of Prince William County, Virginia
Protected areas established in 2002
2002 establishments in Virginia
NOVA Parks